Arthur Googy is an American percussionist known for being the drummer of horror punk band The Misfits from 1980 to 1982. Originally from Jackson Heights, New York, he attended Blessed Sacrament elementary school followed by a brisk visit to Newtown High.

Googy was the longest-running drummer of the band's original era, spanning the years 1980–1982, and was present during the "Master Sound Productions Sessions" that led to the Walk Among Us album. He would tour with the band in several infamous shows, many of which ended up on highly sought-after bootlegs.

His contributions include the albums Walk Among Us, Evilive and 3 Hits from Hell. His work is also prevalent in Collection I and Collection II, as well as the drummer for tracks 9, 12 and 13 on the album Legacy of Brutality. "Die, Die My Darling" from the Die, Die My Darling EP is also attributed to him.

Jerry Only states in the book "American Hardcore" that he attributed a significant amount of success for the album Walk Among Us due to Arthur's dedication to the music and rehearsals. Only goes on to reveal that Arthur worked a full-time job in construction in NYC, lived in Queens and traveled daily to New Jersey.

Googy also drummed for New York hardcore band Antidote.

Discography

With The Misfits
 3 Hits from Hell (1981) - 7-inch EP
 Halloween (1981) - 7-inch single
 Walk Among Us (1982) - LP
 Evilive  (1982)
 Die, Die My Darling (1984) - 7-inch single
 Legacy of Brutality (Tracks 9, 12 and 13)  (1985)
 Collection I (1986)
 Collection II (1995)
 12 Hits From Hell (2001) – LP

With Antidote
 Thou Shalt Not Kill (album)|Thou Shalt Not Kill (1983) - 7-inch EP
 The A7 And Beyond   (1984)

References

Misfits (band) members
American punk rock drummers
American male drummers
Horror punk musicians
Living people
1961 births
American rock drummers
20th-century American drummers